The Catholic Church in Russia, united in the Episcopal Conference of Russia, comprises
 one Latin ecclesiastical province (the Metropolitan archdiocese of Moscow, with three Suffragan dioceses) and a missionary (hence exempt) apostolic prefecture.
 The Eastern Catholics have two proper jurisdictions, each belonging to a different particular church sui iuris and using a different rite.

There are no exempt Latin jurisdictions.

There is an Apostolic Nunciature as papal diplomatic representation (embassy-level) to the Russian Federation in the national capital Moscow.

Current Jurisdictions

Latin Church

Ecclesiastical Province of Moscow 
 Metropolitan Archdiocese of Moscow 
 Diocese of Novosibirsk 
 Diocese of Saratov
 Diocese of Irkutsk

Exempt jurisdiction 
(directly subject to the Holy See)
 Apostolic Prefecture of Yuzhno Sakhalinsk

Eastern Catholic Particular Churches

Russian Catholic Church 
(Byzantine Rite)
 Russian Catholic Apostolic Exarchate of Russia

Armenian Catholic Church 
(Armenian Rite)
 Ordinariate for Armenian Catholics in Eastern Europe, jointly for Russia, Armenia, Georgia (country) and Ukraine

Defunct jurisdictions

Titular sees 
(all Latin)

 One non-metropolitan titular archbishopric
 Archdiocese of Nicopsis
 Two Latin titular bishoprics
 Matrega, formerly Diocese of Matriga
 Latin Titular bishopric of Tanais, formerly of Tana, formerly Diocese of Tana

Other former dioceses 
Exclusing merely renamed/promoted predecessors of current jurisdictions
 Latin 
 Roman Catholic Diocese of Cherson alias Tiraspol (partially in Moldova)
 Roman Catholic Diocese of Sambia (German Samland)
 Apostolic Vicariate of Siberia
 Roman Catholic Diocese of Smolensk
 Roman Catholic Diocese of Vladivostok

Eastern Catholic
 Ruthenian Catholic Eparchy of Smolensk

Crimea 
After the Crimea peninsula was unilaterally annexed by the Russian Federation in March 2014, the Catholic hierarchy was not subsequently changed. The Latin rite Catholics of Crimea belong to the diocese of Odessa-Simferopol which is a Suffragan of the archdiocese of Lviv.

See also 
 List of Catholic dioceses (structured view)

References

External links 
 GCatholic - data for all sections

Russia
Catholic dioceses